Abax is a genus of carabid beetles. There are approximately 100 mostly holarctic species and subspecies in this genus.

These beetles are mostly glossy black with parallel striation on elytra. They are carnivorous.

Species

 Abax arerae Schauberger, 1927
 Abax baenningeri Schauberger, 1927
 Abax beckenhauptii (Duftschmid, 1812)
 Abax carinatus (Duftschmid, 1812)
 Abax continuus Ganglbauer, 1891
 Abax ecchelii Bertalini, 1887
 Abax exaratus (Dejean, 1828)
 Abax fiorii Jakobson, 1907
 Abax oblongus Dejean, 1831
 Abax ovalis (Duftschmid, 1812)
 Abax parallelepipedus Piller & Mitterpacher, 1783
 Abax parallelus Duftschmid, 1812
 Abax pilleri Csiki, 1916
 Abax pyrenaeus Dejean, 1828
 Abax schueppeli Palliardi, 1825
 Abax springeri J. Muller, 1925
 Abax teriolensis Schauberger, 1921

References

Pterostichinae
Carabidae genera